The men's team épée was one of seven fencing events on the fencing at the 1932 Summer Olympics programme. It was the sixth appearance of the event. The competition was held from 5 August 1932 to 7 August 1932. 32 fencers from 7 nations competed, with two other nations entering but not appearing. Each team could have a maximum of six fencers, with four participating in any given match.

The competition format continued the pool play round-robin from prior years, but increased the number of touches to win a bout to 3. Each of the four fencers from one team would face each of the four from the other, for a total of 16 bouts per match. The team that won more bouts won the match. Matches were sometimes stopped when one team had won (e.g., Belgium against Canada was stopped at 9–2), but sometimes not (United States against Canada played all the way to 15–1). Pool matches unnecessary to the result were not played (with Belgium and the United States both beating Canada, the result between those two countries would not affect qualification and thus they did not face each other.

Rosters

Belgium
 André Poplimont
 Max Janlet
 Balthazar De Beukelaer
 Werner Mund
 Raoul Henkart

Canada
 Ernest Dalton
 Bertram Markus
 Patrick Farrell
 Henri Delcellier

Denmark
 Axel Bloch
 Aage Leidersdorff
 Erik Kofoed-Hansen
 Ivan Osiier

France
 Fernand Jourdant
 Bernard Schmetz
 Georges Tainturier
 Georges Buchard
 Jean Piot
 Philippe Cattiau

Italy
 Carlo Agostoni
 Franco Riccardi
 Renzo Minoli
 Saverio Ragno
 Giancarlo Cornaggia-Medici

Mexico
 Gerónimo Delgadillo
 Eduardo Prieto Souza
 Eduardo Prieto
 Francisco Valero

United States
 George Calnan
 Gustave Heiss
 Tracy Jaeckel
 Miguel de Capriles
 Curtis Shears
 Frank Righeimer

Results

Round 1

The top two teams in each pool advanced to the semifinals. Cuba and Hungary both withdrew, leaving their pools with only two entrants and resulting in no pool matches for those groups.

Pool 1

Pool 2

Pool 3

Semifinals

The top two teams in each semifinal advanced to the final.

Semifinal 1

Semifinal 2

The match between the United States and Denmark was the only one actually contested. It ended in an 8–8 tie, broken by touches against at 28 for the United States to 33 for Denmark. Denmark then forfeited its match against France, which was scored 16–0.

Final

References

Epee team
Men's events at the 1932 Summer Olympics